Aleppian or Alepian may refer to :

 Inhabitants of the Syrian city of Aleppo and their descendants
 Members of some Eastern Catholic monastic Congregations :
 Basilian Aleppian Order, an Antiochian rite Order
 Basilian Aleppian Sisters, the female branch of the Aleppian Order
 Mariamite Maronite Order, an Antiochian rite